A magnetic level gauge is a type of level sensor, i.e., a device used to measure the level of fluids. A magnetic level gauge includes a “floatable” device that can float both in high and low density fluids. Magnetic level gauges may also be designed to accommodate severe environmental conditions up to 210 bars at 370 °C.

Magnetic level sensors

Magnetic float level sensors involve the use of a permanent magnet sealed inside a float whose rise and fall causes the opening or closing of a mechanical switch, either through direct contact or in proximity of a reed switch. With mechanically actuated floats, the float is directly connected to a micro switch. For both magnetic and mechanical float level sensors, chemical compatibility, temperature, specific gravity (density), buoyancy, and viscosity affect the selection of the stem and the float. For example, larger floats may be used with liquids with specific gravities as low as 0.5 while still maintaining buoyancy. The choice of float material is also influenced by temperature-induced changes in specific gravity and viscosity – changes that directly affect buoyancy.

Explanation

Exploring the physics and engineering behind this design, requires looking at basic magnetism. A standard bar magnet has two magnetic poles: north and south. (The north will read positive on a gauss meter and the south will read negative.) Magnetic field are mapped using magnetic flux lines. These lines are a graphical representation of the magnetic field density. They show the direction of flow for the magnetic field and represent relative field strength – the closer together the lines are, the stronger the magnetic field. Flux lines will always travel from the north pole to the nearest south pole and always leave and enter surfaces at 90°, or perpendicular to the surface. They can only travel in straight lines or curved paths, which means they can never make a sudden, abrupt change in direction. Flux lines will also always follow a path of least magnetic resistance. Most importantly, they can never cross one another.

Considerations

When selecting a magnetic level gauge it is important to take into account the strength of the magnetic field. The magnetic field is the heart of the magnetic level gauge – the stronger the field, the more reliable the instrument will function. Some manufacturers rely on a single magnet for their magnetic level gauges which causes the strength of the north field to be identical to, and as weak as, the south field. It is apparent that at the location of the indicators, switches and transmitters, the field would not be as intense. Some manufacturers use a single annular ring magnet, others use a series of single bar magnets in a circular array in their float design. In this design the relative field strength of the north and south poles will be equal to one another and less than that of a dual magnet design. Moreover, the field strength as you travel around the circumference will have high and low spots as you pass between the individual bar magnets.

References

Measuring instruments